"Let's Make Nasty" is the fourth single by Larry Tee featuring Roxy Cottontail from his album Club Badd.

Chart performance
"Let's Make Nasty" became Larry Tee's first single to chart on the Dutch Singles Chart.  It became successful on the Belgian Dance Chart, peaking at #1 and spending a total of 8 weeks on the chart.

Song usage
"Let's Make Nasty (Afrojack Remix)" was included on the compilation album Ultra Electro 3 by Ultra Records.

Charts

References

2009 singles
2009 songs
Songs written by Larry Tee